The English gothic rock band Alien Sex Fiend have released 13 studio albums, six live albums, 17 compilation albums, two extended plays, 22 singles and eight video albums. Most of their releases have been on Anagram Records, a sub-label of Cherry Red Records. The band have also released three studio albums and three singles on the 13th Moon label, founded in 1996 by band members Nik Wade (Nik Fiend) and Christine Wade (Mrs. Fiend). 

In the 1980s, the band's releases regularly reached the top 20 on the UK Indie Chart, beginning with the 1983 release of "Ignore the Machine", which peaked at No. 6 on the UK Indie Singles Chart. Between 1983 and 1987, 12 more Alien Sex Fiend singles appeared on the charts, all but one of which reached the top 20. Five of their albums made the top 20 on the UK Independent Album Chart.

Two mid-1980s singles also made the official UK Singles Chart: "Dead and Buried" peaked at No. 91 in 1984, while a reissued version of "Ignore the Machine" reached No. 99 the following year. Maximum Security was the band's sole album to make the UK Albums Chart, reaching No. 100 in 1985.

Albums

Studio albums

Live albums

Compilation albums

Box sets

Video albums

EPs

Singles

References

External links
 

Punk rock group discographies
Discographies of British artists